Pohjanpää is a Finnish surname. Notable people with the surname include:

 Elina Pohjanpää (1933–1996), Finnish actress
 Arvi Pohjanpää (1887–1959), Finnish gymnast, judge, and writer

Finnish-language surnames